This is a list of members of the Queensland Legislative Council from 1 January 1917 to the Council's abolition on 23 March 1922. Appointments, made by the Governor of Queensland, were for life, although many members for one reason or another resigned.

Background

The Legislative Council had become a "thorn in the side" of the Labor government, led by T. J. Ryan and in power since the 1915 election, having rejected or drastically amended over 800 bills between 1915 and 1918. Having failed at a referendum on 5 May 1917 to abolish the council, Labor opted for a new strategy  –  to stack the Legislative Council with Labor appointees who would then vote themselves out of existence.

In July 1917, the Governor, Sir Hamilton Goold-Adams, agreed reluctantly to Ryan's request to appoint 13 members to the Legislative Council. All of the new members had to sign a pledge supporting the abolition of the Council, and were sworn in on 10–12 October 1917. Another three were added to their number on 18 August 1919, and 14 on 19 February 1920 under new Premier Ted Theodore.

Following the death of Labor president of the Council William Hamilton on 27 July 1920, William Lennon, the Speaker of the Assembly was appointed a member and President. By this time, there were 57 members of the Council, 30 of whom were Labor members who had been appointed since the 1917 referendum, and four additional members were pre-existing Labor appointees.

Following a 51–15 vote in the Assembly in favour of the Constitution Act Amendment Bill 1921, Alfred Jones, the leader of the Government in the Council, commented on 26 October: "Today, we advocate the abolition of the Council because of its uselessness. [...] Until we had a majority here, it was obstructive, and now that we have a majority here it is useless". The bill passed by 28–10, and the Council met for the last time on 27 October 1921. The Council formally ceased to exist on 23 March 1922 after the Bill received royal assent on 3 March.

Office bearers

President of the Legislative Council:
 William Hamilton (15 February 1917 – 27 July 1920)
 William Lennon (18 August 1920 – 23 March 1922)

Chairman of Committees:
 William Taylor (Labor) (30 September 1913 – 16 November 1920)
 Thomas Nevitt (Labor) (17 November 1920 – 23 March 1922)

Members

Members shaded red were Labor Party members of the Council.

  Randolph Bedford resigned on 21 February 1918 and was reappointed on 27 May 1918.
  William Dunstan resigned on 15 June 1921 and was reappointed on 15 August 1921.

References

 Waterson, Duncan Bruce: Biographical Register of the Queensland Parliament 1860–1929 (second edition), Sydney 2001.
 Alphabetical Register of Members (Queensland Parliament)
 Abolition of the Legislative Council (Queensland Parliament)

Members of Queensland parliaments by term
20th-century Australian politicians